Vladimir Valeryevich Kazakov (born 26 November 1970) is a Russian professional football coach and a former player. He is an assistant coach with FC Nizhny Novgorod.

Club career
As a player, he made his debut in the Soviet Second League in 1988 for FC Dynamo Vologda.

Honours
 Russian Premier League bronze: 2000.
 Russian First Division best defender: 2005.

European club competitions
 UEFA Intertoto Cup 1997 with FC Lokomotiv Nizhny Novgorod: 2 games.
 UEFA Intertoto Cup 1998 with FC Shinnik Yaroslavl: 2 games.
 UEFA Cup 2000–01 with FC Torpedo Moscow: 2 games.

References

1970 births
People from Murom
Living people
Soviet footballers
Russian footballers
Association football midfielders
FC Lokomotiv Nizhny Novgorod players
FC Shinnik Yaroslavl players
FC Torpedo Moscow players
FC Elista players
FC Moscow players
FC Luch Vladivostok players
Russian football managers
FC Nizhny Novgorod managers
Russian Premier League players
FC Nizhny Novgorod (2007) players
FC Torpedo Moscow managers
FC Dynamo Vologda players
Sportspeople from Vladimir Oblast